Mountain House or Willow Springs Station, in what is now Kern County, California, was a stage station of the Butterfield Overland Mail, located 12 miles south of Fountain Spring Station, and 15 miles northeast of Posey Creek Station at Willow Springs on Willow Springs Creek.

References

External links
 Exterior view of the Willow Springs Gold Mine and Stage Station, Kern County, ca.1900, #1 from USC Digital Library
 Exterior view of the Willow Springs Mine and Stage Station, Kern County, ca.1900, #2 from USC Digital Library
 Exterior view of the Willow Springs Mine and Stage Station, Kern County, ca.1900, #3 from USC Digital Library

See also
 Butterfield Overland Mail in California

Former settlements in Kern County, California
Former populated places in California
Populated places established in 1858
Butterfield Overland Mail in California
1858 establishments in California
Stagecoach stops in the United States